Ahimaaz ( ʾĂḥīmaʿaṣ, "My Brother Is Counselor") was son of the high priest Zadok.

He first appears in the reign of King David (reigned c. 1000-962 BCE). During Absalom's revolt he remained faithful to David, and, along with Jonathan, son of Abiathar, assisted him by giving him news about the proceedings of Absalom in Jerusalem (2 Samuel 15:24–37; 17:15–21). He was a swift runner, and was the first to bring David news of the defeat of Absalom, although he refrained from mentioning his death (2 Samuel 18:19–33).

Under King Solomon (c. 970–930 BCE), Ahimaaz's father Zadok became high priest. When Zadok died, Ahimaaz succeeded him in that position (1 Chronicles 6:8, 53).

He may have been the same Ahimaaz who took as wife Basemath, one of Solomon's daughters (1 Kings 4:15). Subsequent kings of Israel, Ahaz, also married daughters of the high priest.

Patrilineal ancestry

References

Attribution

10th-century BCE High Priests of Israel
People associated with David